Jacktown may refer to:

Jacktown (film), an American film
Jacktown, Kentucky, a community in Casey County, Kentucky
Jacktown, Michigan, a small town in Empire Township, Leelanau County, Michigan
Jackson, Mississippi, also known as Jack-Town